Old Eidfjord Church is a former parish church of the Church of Norway in Eidfjord Municipality in Vestland county, Norway. It is located in the village of Eidfjord. It was historically the church for the Eidfjord parish which is part of the Hardanger og Voss prosti (deanery) in the Diocese of Bjørgvin. The whitewashed, stone church was built in a rectangular design around the year 1309 using plans drawn up by an unknown architect. The church seats about 100 people.

The church was the main church for the Eidfjord parish (sokn) until 1981 when the new Eidfjord Church was completed. The old church is now used only for special occasions since it only seats about 100 people. The church is decorated as to look as it did in the 18th century.

History
The earliest existing historical records of the church date back to around the year 1309 in a letter talking about how Thorgeir Peterson Sponheim gave money to help pay for the construction of this church. The church was originally constructed around the year 1300 using stone. The church's chancel and nave have the same width, giving the church a rectangular design. During the 1600s, records show that the walls were in poor condition and so they were significantly repaired. Strangely, Eidfjord Church historically belonged to the Diocese of Stavanger, while the neighboring Kinsarvik Church and Ulvik Church (and the rest of the county) belonged to the Diocese of Bjørgvin. In 1630, the parish of Eidfjord was transferred to the Diocese of Bjørgvin. During the late-1600s, a wooden church porch was built on the west end of the nave. It wasn't until the 19th century that the church received a small tower on the roof. By the late-20th century, the old church was no longer appropriate to continue using as the church for the parish. A new Eidfjord Church was built just northwest of the old church in 1981 to replace the centuries-old building. Afterwards, the old church was renamed "Old Eidfjord Church" and it was taken out of regular use. It is now used mostly as a museum, but it is still used for special occasions.

Media gallery

See also
List of churches in Bjørgvin

References

Eidfjord
Churches in Vestland
Rectangular churches in Norway
Stone churches in Norway
14th-century churches in Norway
Buildings and structures completed in 1309
14th-century establishments in Norway